The National Education League was a political movement in England and Wales which promoted elementary education for all children, free from religious control.

The National Education League, founded 1869, developed from the Birmingham Education League, co-founded in 1867 by George Dixon, a Birmingham Member of Parliament (MP) and past mayor, Joseph Chamberlain, a nonconformist and future mayor of Birmingham, and Jesse Collings, to include branches from all over England and Wales. Dixon was chairman of the League's council. Chamberlain became chairman of the executive committee. Collings was the honorary secretary. Other leading founding members (all in Birmingham) were R. W. Dale, A. Follett Osler, J. H. Chamberlain, George Dawson, and William Harris. Twenty founding members subscribed £14,000. The first general meeting was in October 1869, by which time William Dronfield of Sheffield was acting as Secretary. It resolved that a bill should be prepared to present to Parliament at the next session.

The League was opposed by the National Educational Union of Manchester, consisting of Conservatives and Anglicans.

Dixon and Chamberlain were campaigners for the provision of non-sectarian education free of influence by the churches. The Anglicans and Catholic Churches were in control of most of the existing voluntary schools, and controlled the religious education of those who attended. The Liberals and Dissenters wanted compulsory education without religious doctrine. In the end the Elementary Education Act 1870, which created school boards, was a compromise filling in the gaps of the voluntary system. The League continued campaigning for eight years for adoption of their original requirements, before being dissolved in 1877.

Objectives of the league
Each of the League's documents included their objectives:

See also
Elementary Education Act 1870

Sources

 
 
 
 
 
 Collected reports and publications of the National Education League, Library of Birmingham, A370.8, z1103222

History of education in England
History of Birmingham, West Midlands
1869 establishments in England
1877 disestablishments in the United Kingdom